"Tribe" is the fourth single by heavy metal band Soulfly, released in January 1999. It is played as the ninth track of the eponymous debut album Soulfly, after "Bleed" and before "Bumba". "Tribe" is the fourth and last single of the album. As with every other Soulfly songs with vocals, the lyrics were written by Max Cavalera.

Lyrics and music 
The first section of lyrics deal about Zumbi in Portuguese and then tribe in relation to life and god. The last section lists different tribes in alphabetical order, including Aboriginal, Hopi, Māori, and Mohican.

The first minute of this six-minute song plays a berimbau with a man singing a traditional song in Portuguese about Zumbi and his quilombo Palmares's resistance to the Portuguese. Tin can-sounded drums would start before going into churning metal riffs containing power chords, with drums performed during the rest and then played over the riff. Tribal part is played during the last quarter of the song before ending with the same rhythm in metal.

Track listing

Personnel 

Band members
 Max Cavalera – vocals, rhythm guitar, berimbau
 Marcello D. Rapp – bass
 Roy Mayorga – drums, percussion
Additional musicians
 Jackson Bandeira – lead guitar
 Gilmar Bolla Oito – tambora
 Jorge du Peixe – tambora
 Chris Flam – programming and engineering on track one
 Benji Webbe – vocals on track two

Additional personal
 Ross Robinson – production
 Roy Mayorga – remixing and additional production on track one
 The Rootsman – additional producer and remixing on track two
 Josh Abraham – additional producer and remixing on track three
 Brian Virtue – mixing on track three
 Holger Drees – design

See also
Tribe (EP)

Charts

References 

Soulfly songs
1998 singles
Songs written by Max Cavalera
Roadrunner Records singles
1998 songs